Maharaja Sir Ishwari Singhji, KCIE (8 March 1893 – 23 April 1945) was the 27th ruler of the princely state of Bundi belonging to Hada Chauhan clan of Rajputs.

He was the ruler of Bundi from 1927, when he ascended the throne upon the death of Raghubir Singh and ruled until his death in 1945. He was nephew of the deceased ruler Raghubir Singh of Bundi and ascended the throne upon his death on 8 August 1927 and was invested with full ruling powers a month later on 26 September 1927. He served as Aide-de-Camp (Honorary) to King George VI in 1945.

He was succeeded by his adopted son Bahadur Singh upon his death in 1945.

References

1893 births
1945 deaths
Knights Grand Commander of the Order of the Indian Empire
Maharajas of Bundi
Rajput rulers
Hindu monarchs
Indian knights
Indian royalty